Juan Héctor Guidi (14 July 1930 – 8 February 1973) was an Argentine football midfielder.  He played most of his career with Club Atlético Lanús he also made 37 appearances for the Argentina national team.

Club career

Guidi, born in the city of Piñeiro, Avellaneda, started his career with local club Unidos de Piñeiro, before joining Lanús in 1949. In 1950 he helped the team to win the Argentine 2nd Division in 1950.

Guidi had a spell with Club Atlético Independiente but he never achieved the level of play that he had at Lanús.

Guidi rejoined Lanús helping them to win the 2nd division title in 1964. Guidi retired from football in 1966.

International career

Guidi represented Argentina in two Copa Américas, the victorious Peru 1957 campaign and the Ecuador 1959 where Argentina finished in second place. He played a total of 37 games for Argentina putting him in the top 50 most capped Argentine footballers of all time.

Honours

Club
Lanús
 Primera B: 1950, 1964

International
 Argentina
 Copa América: Peru 1957
 Panamerican Championship: 1960

Legacy

El Nene Guidi died in 1973 at the age of just 42, he is remembered as one of the most important idols of Club Atlético Lanús. One of the streets outside La Fortaleza was renamed Héctor Guidi in his honour.

References

External links
Biography on the Lanús website 

1930 births
1973 deaths
Sportspeople from Avellaneda
Argentine footballers
Argentina international footballers
Association football midfielders
Club Atlético Lanús footballers
Club Atlético Independiente footballers
Argentine Primera División players